Carol Smallwood (born May 3, 1939) is an American poet and writer.

Early life and education 
Carol Smallwood was born May 3, 1939, in Cheboygan, Michigan to teachers Lloyd and Lucy Gouine. She received her Bachelor of Science degree from Eastern Michigan University in 1961 followed by a master's degree in Art in 1963, and MLA Library Science degree from Western Michigan University in 1976.

Married in 1963 and divorced in 1976, Smallwood has two children.

Career 
Smallwood began working in the education and library administration fields in 1961. She has written non-fiction books for libraries with the intention of providing public and higher-education libraries with strategies and tested programs to encourage patron interaction.

She stated in an interview that her first book "came from teachers asking where to get materials", and that she started writing poetry after being told her "chan[c]es were slim of surviving cancer".

Awards 
 National Federation of State Poetry Societies Award
 Franklin-Christoph Poetry Contest Winner
 ByLine 1st Place for First Chapter of a Novel

Selected publications

Fiction 
 A Ceremony, The Head & The Hand Press, 2014.

Non-fiction 
 Library Partnerships With Writers and Poets: Case Studies (joint author with Vera Gubnitskaia), McFarland & Company, 2017. 
 Interweavings: Creative Nonfiction, Shanti Arts Publishing, 2017. 
 The Complete Guide to Using Google in Libraries: Volume 1 Instruction, Administration and Staff Productivity, Volume 2 (editor), McFarland & Company, 2015.  
 Creative Management of Small Public Libraries in the 21st Century, Rowman & Littlefield, 2014. 
 Writing After Retirement: Tips From Successful Retired Writers (joint editor with Christine Redman-Waldeyer), Rowman & Littlefield, 2014. 
 Library Services for Multicultural Patrons: Strategies to Encourage Library Use (joint editor with Kim Becnel), Scarecrow Press, 2013. 
 Continuing Education for Librarians: Essays on Career Improvement through Classes, Workshops, Conferences and More, McFarland & Company, 2013. 
 Women on Poetry: Writing, Revising, Publishing and Teaching (joint editor with Colleen S. Harris, and Cynthia Brackett-Vincent), McFarland & Company, 2012. 
 How to Thrive as a Solo Librarian (joint editor with Melissa J. Clapp), Scarecrow Press, 2011. 
 The Frugal Librarian: Thriving in Tough Economic Times , 2011.
 Contemporary American Women: Our Defining Passages (joint editor with Cynthia Brackett-Vincent), All Things That Matter Press, 2009. 
 Librarians as Community Partners: An Outreach Handbook , ALA Editions, 2009.
 Insider's Guide to School Libraries: Tips and Resources , Linworth Publishing, 1997. 
 A Guide to Selected Federal Agency Programs and Publications for Librarians and Teachers , Libraries Umlimited Inc, 1986.

Novels 
 Lily's Odyssey, All Things That Matter Press, 2010.

Poetry 
 On the Way to Wendy's , Pudding House Publications, 2008. 
 
 Poetry A Matter of Selection, Poetic Matrix Press, 2018. 
 Prisms, Particles, and Refractions, Finishing Line Press, 2017. 
 In Hubble's Shadow, Shanti Arts Publishing, 2017. 
 Divining the Prime Meridian, WordTech Editions, 2015. 
 Water, Earth, Air, Fire, and Picket Fences, Lamar University Press, 2014. 
 Compartments: Poems on Nature, Femininity and Other Realms, Anaphora Literary Press, 2011. 
 
 Visits and Other Passages, Finishing Line Press, January 2019. 
 Chronicles in Passage, Poetic Matrix Press, August 2019. 
 Thread, Form, and Other Enclosures, Main Street Rag Publishing, October 2020. 
 The Illusiveness of Gray, Kelsay Books, May 2021.

References

External links 
 Interview with Smallwood
 Smallwood portfolio
 Library's listing of Smallwood's books

Living people
Poets from Michigan
Eastern Michigan University alumni
21st-century American poets
American women poets
American librarians
American women librarians
American women novelists
21st-century American novelists
21st-century American women writers
1939 births
Novelists from Michigan
American women non-fiction writers
21st-century American non-fiction writers